Edward Berrie (8 April 1884 – 8 December 1963) was an Australian cricketer. He played one first-class match for New South Wales in 1913/14.

See also
 List of New South Wales representative cricketers

References

External links
 

1884 births
1963 deaths
Australian cricketers
New South Wales cricketers